Onthophagus vacca is a species of dung beetles in the Onthophagini tribe of the wider scarab beetle family, Scarabaeidae.

Description
Pronotum is densely punctured. The first pair of legs are powerful, with three teeth on the outside and fit to digging. Head, legs and pronotum are black or dark green, while elytrae are yellowish with small green dots, often merged into longitudinal stripes.

Distribution
This species is present in most of Southern Europe, Western Asia and North Africa. It was introduced to Australia in 2014 to improve processing of cattle dung.

Bibliography
 Mulsant E. (1842) Histoire naturelle des Coléoptères de France. Lamellicornes, Paris, Lyon :1-623
 Linnaeus C. (1767) Systema naturae per regna tria naturae, secundum classes, ordines, genera, species cum characteribus, differentiis, synonymis, locis. Editio XII, Laurentii Salvi, Holmiae 1:1-1327
 Scarabs: World Scarabaeidae Database. Schoolmeesters P.
 Rossner, E.; Schonfeld, J.; Ahrens, D. 2010. Onthophagus (Palaeonthophagus) medius (Kugelann, 1792)—a good western palaearctic species in the Onthophagus vacca complex (Coleoptera: Scarabaeidae: Scarabaeinae: Onthophagini). Zootaxa 2629: 1–28.
 Peter Sowig  Brood care in the dung beetle Onthophagus vacca (Coleoptera: Scarabaeidae): the effect of soil moisture on time budget, nest structure, and reproductive success Volume 19, Issue 3,  pages 254–258, January 1996

References

External links
 Società Entomologica Italiana

Scarabaeinae
Beetles described in 1767
Taxa named by Carl Linnaeus